The 1960–61 Kentucky Wildcats men's basketball team represented the University of Kentucky during the 1960–61 NCAA men's basketball season.

Schedule

References

Kentucky Wildcats men's basketball seasons
Kentucky
Kentucky Wildcats
Kentucky Wildcats